Caviphantes is a genus of  dwarf spiders that was first described by R. Oi in 1960.

Species
 it contains five species:
Caviphantes dobrogicus (Dumitrescu & Miller, 1962) – Romania to Central Asia
Caviphantes flagellatus (Zhu & Zhou, 1992) – China
Caviphantes pseudosaxetorum Wunderlich, 1979 – Lebanon to India, Nepal, China, Russia (Kurile Is.), Japan
Caviphantes samensis Oi, 1960 (type) – China, Japan
Caviphantes saxetorum (Hull, 1916) – USA, Europe, Russia (Urals, South Siberia)

See also
 List of Linyphiidae species

References

Araneomorphae genera
Holarctic spiders
Linyphiidae
Spiders of Asia